Bully Pulpit Games, based in Chapel Hill, North Carolina, is a small publisher of indie role-playing games. Their games include The Shab-al-Hiri Roach, Grey Ranks, Fiasco and Durance. Bully Pulpit's Jason Morningstar is also the creator of many other small, free games such as Dungeon Squad which are not published under the Bully Pulpit name.

The publisher is named for a phrase coined by Theodore Roosevelt. The site's logo includes a silhouette of the former President, and its front page includes a quote from him.

Bully Pulpit Games publishes their sales numbers on the company website each quarter for the sake of transparency under the heading Square Deal.

Games
 Carolina Death Crawl
 Durance
 Fiasco - Winner, 2011 Diana Jones Award for Excellence in Gaming, Winner, Best Support, 2009 Indie RPG Awards
 The Shab-al-Hiri Roach
 The Fiasco Companion - Fiasco Companion – RPGgeek Golden Geek 2012 Best Supplement
 Grey Ranks - Joint Winner, 2008 Diana Jones Award for Excellence in Gaming, Winner, Innovation in a Role Playing Game and Independent Game of the Year, 2007 Indie RPG Awards
 Drowning and Falling
 The Warren
 Ghost Court
 Star Crossed - Winner, 2019 Diana Jones Award for Excellence in Gaming

See also 
 Bully Pulpit Games is a part of the Bits and Mortar initiative (since September 2010)

References

External links 
 Bully Pulpit Games

Indie role-playing games
Role-playing game publishing companies
Companies based in Chapel Hill-Carrboro, North Carolina